The Land Run of 1895 was the smallest and last land run in the U.S. state of Oklahoma. It came about with an agreement between the Kickapoo Indians and the federal government that gave individual Kickapoos . The federal government purchased the remaining  and opened them up to settlers.

The land run took place on May 23, 1895. It was delayed since 1890, because of debate among tribal members over whether to accept allotment offers. Federal officials used "unscrupulous methods" to gain the signatures of tribal leaders and the Kickapoo Allotment Act was passed by the U.S. Congress on March 30, 1893. The proclamation opening the land was signed by President Grover Cleveland.

Background
Only  were available for homesteading, as land was set aside for schools.

Aftermath
The small scope of the fifth and final land run resulted in numerous lawsuits and land contests. Future land openings were handled by auction or lottery. Many individuals were unable to claim land and Oklahoma Territorial Governor William C. Renfrow opened up an additional  of school land for lease to give those individuals an opportunity.

The land run led to the formation of McLoud, Hagar, Wellston, Kickapoo, and North Wichita, Oklahoma; and increased the size of Lincoln, Pottawatomie, and Oklahoma counties.

References

See also
 Land Run of 1889
 Land Run of 1891
 Land Run of 1892
 Land Run of 1893

History of United States expansionism
Pre-statehood history of Oklahoma
1895 in Oklahoma Territory
May 1895 events
Kickapoo